Symmoca dodecatella is a moth of the family Symmocidae. It is found in Portugal and Spain.

The wingspan is about 18–19 mm. The forewings are grey, sprinkled with black, mainly along the margin. The hindwings are grey.

References

Moths described in 1859
Symmoca